Eniel Polynice (born May 18, 1988) is an American basketball player for Saint-Quentin of the LNB Pro B.

Biography
Polynice was born in Sarasota, Florida. He graduated from Ole Miss with a B.A. in Broadcast Journalism and an M.A. in Strategic Communications from Seton Hall. In addition to English, he is fluent in French, and Haitian Creole. He is the nephew of retired NBA veteran and former first round, eighth overall selection of the Chicago Bulls, Olden Polynice.

Professional
Polynice was a third round selection of the Los Angeles D-fenders in 2011 of the NBA Development League and became the team's only true rookie that year. As a guard he has a long wingspan, measured at 7 ft 2 in, which allows him to play the small forward position. Since his time in the D-League, he has played in multiple international leagues.

References

External links
 Eniel Polynice at espn.com

1988 births
Living people
American sportspeople of Haitian descent
Atléticos de San Germán players
Haitian men's basketball players
Los Angeles D-Fenders players
Ole Miss Rebels men's basketball players
Point guards
Seton Hall Pirates men's basketball players
Shooting guards
Sportspeople from Sarasota, Florida
American men's basketball players